Agonum is a large genus of ground beetles in the subfamily Harpalinae, tribe Platynini. They are mid-sized to smallish beetles, typically with dark metallic hues – often reddish or bronze, but sometimes black, green etc.

The genus is generally native to the Holarctic and the Mediterranean region; their southern limit in Central Asia and the Himalaya region is less well understood, and they seem to range outward a bit out of their core regions (e.g. into East Africa).

They are wet-loving throughout their life cycle; for example, the genus is well represented in Ireland, where they are more plentiful than anywhere else in Europe.

Subgenera and selected species
While some subgenera are accepted by most authors (e.g. Europhilus, Olisares and of course Agonum), others are of disputed validity. Moreover, subgeneric separation has historically been mostly focussed on European and Japanese species. The following list does not incorporate the most recent reviews and must be considered very preliminary.

Agonum (Agonothorax) Motschulsky, 1850 (sometimes in Olisares or Punctagonum)
Agonum ericeti (Panzer, 1809)
Agonum impressum (Panzer, 1796)
Agonum sexpunctatum
Agonum viridicupreum (Goeze, 1777)

Agonum (Agonum) Bonelli, 1810
Agonum angustatum Dejean, 1828
Agonum antennarium (Duftschmid, 1812)
Agonum carbonarium Dejean, 1828
Agonum chalconotum Menetries, 1832
Agonum chinense Boheman, 1858 (tentatively placed here)
Agonum curvipes (C. R. Sahlberg 1827) (sometimes in Olisares)
Agonum dolens
Agonum hexacoelum
Agonum kretaense Kirschenhofer, 1982
Agonum liebherri J.Schmidt, 2008 (tentatively placed here)
Agonum marginatum (Linne, 1758)
Agonum monachum (Duftschmid, 1812)
Agonum muelleri
Agonum nigrum Dejean, 1828
Agonum numidicum Lucas, 1849
Agonum pirata
Agonum quinquepunctatum
Agonum rugicolle Chaudoir, 1846
Agonum scintillans Boheman, 1858 (tentatively placed here)
Agonum sordidum Dejean, 1828

Agonum (Deratanchus) (sometimes in Olisares)

Agonum (Europhilus) Chaudoir, 1859
Agonum consimile (Gyllenhal, 1810)
Agonum exaratum (Mannerheim, 1853)
Agonum fuliginosum (Panzer, 1809)
Agonum gracile Sturm, 1824
Agonum micans (Nicolai, 1822)
Agonum munsteri (Hellen, 1935)
Agonum piceum (Linne, 1758)
Agonum scitulum Dejean, 1828
Agonum temperei (Aubry, 1974) (tentatively placed here)
Agonum thoreyi Dejean, 1828

Agonum (Melanagonum) (sometimes in Olisares)
Agonum afrum
Agonum duftschmidi J.Schmidt, 1994
Agonum extensum
Agonum gerdmuelleri J.Schmidt, 1994
Agonum gisellae
Agonum hypocrita (Apfelbeck, 1904)
Agonum longicorne Chaudoir, 1846
Agonum lugens (Duftschmid, 1812)
Agonum nitidum
Agonum permoestum Puel, 1938
Agonum pseudomoestum Schuler, 1963
Agonum versutum Sturm, 1824
Agonum viduum (Panzer, 1796)

Agonum (Micragonum) (sometimes in Olisares)

Agonum (Olisares)

Agonum (Platynomicrus) (sometimes in Agonum)
Agonum bicolor (Dejean, 1828)
Agonum nigriceps LeConte, 1846 

Agonum (Punctagonum) (sometimes in Olisares)

Agonum (Stereagonum) (sometimes in Olisares)

Agonum (Stictanchus) (sometimes in Agonum)
Agonum gracilipes (Duftschmid, 1812)

See also
 List of Agonum species

References

External links

 Agonum at Fauna Europaea

 
Carabidae genera
Harpalinae